The Schoolfield Welfare Building is a historic function hall at 917 West Main Street in Danville, Virginia.  The architecturally eclectic brick two story building was built 1916-17 by Dan River, Inc. as a social center for its workers.  The building has a Mission-style tile hip roof, with extended eaves supported by brackets.  The building housed meeting spaces, a day-care center, and a medical clinic, as well as providing a large function space.  A kindergarten playhouse made out of false logs and daubing was added to the property in 1938.  It is now owned by a non-profit organization.

The building was listed on the National Register of Historic Places in 2011.

See also
National Register of Historic Places listings in Danville, Virginia

References

Event venues on the National Register of Historic Places in Virginia
Colonial Revival architecture in Virginia
Buildings and structures completed in 1917
Buildings and structures in Danville, Virginia
National Register of Historic Places in Danville, Virginia